Franz Xaver Reithmayr (16 March 1809 – 26 January 1872) was a German Catholic theologian who specialized in New Testament exegesis. He was born in Illkofen, located near Regensburg.

He studied theology in Regensburg and at the University of Munich. In 1832 he received his ordination, and for a period of time taught classes at the Latin School in Regensburg. Afterwards, he returned to Munich and continued his studies under theologian Johann Adam Möhler (1796-1838), who was a profound influence to Reithmayr's career. After Möhler's death in 1838, he edited and published his mentor's "Patrologie oder christliche Literärgeschichte" (Patrology or Christian literary history).

In 1836 he earned his doctorate in theology, and in 1841 was appointed a full professor of New Testament exegesis at the Catholic Theological Faculty of the University of Munich, a position he maintained until his death. In 1869 he became an editor of the "Bibliothek der Kirchenväter" (Library of the Church Fathers). The following are some of his better literary efforts:
 Commentar zum Briefe an die Römer (Commentary on the Epistle to the Romans), Regensburg (1843). 
 Einleitung in die canonischen Bücher des Neuen Bundes (Introduction to the canon of the New Testament books), Regensburg (1852).
 Commentar zum Briefe an die Galater (Commentary on the Epistle to the Galatians), Münich (1865).
 Lehrbuch der biblischen Hermeneutik (Textbook of Biblical hermeneutics), (1874); edited and published by Valentin Thalhofer (1825-1891).

References 
 Cyclopaedia of Biblical, Theological, and Ecclesiastical Literature (biography)

1809 births
1872 deaths
People from Regensburg (district)
19th-century German Catholic theologians
Academic staff of the Ludwig Maximilian University of Munich
German male non-fiction writers
19th-century male writers